Cytrel is a cellulose-based tobacco substitute used in some low-tar cigarette brands. It formerly constituted 25% of Silk Cut cigarettes.

Development began on a replacement for tobacco in cigarettes in the 1950s, to reduce undesirable tobacco smoke components present in cigarettes. Cytrel was developed by Celanese Fiber Marketing Company.

The fiber went through a difficult development, with scientists struggling to achieve acceptable smoking, taste, and manufacturing properties. However, the product was of a lower density than tobacco and useful as a bulking agent so development continued. After five revisions the Celanese Fiber Marketing Company released Type 308 to the market.

It was one of the NSM (New Smoking Materials) that came into popularity in the 1970s.

See also 

 Silk Cut

External links
 https://web.archive.org/web/20110517111059/http://tobaccodocuments.org/rjr/501012107-2191.html

Cigarettes